The 11th Minnesota Infantry Regiment was a Minnesota USV infantry regiment that served in the Union Army during the American Civil War.

Service
The 11th Minnesota Infantry Regiment was recruited into Federal service at Fort Snelling, Minnesota, between August and September 1864. Its original term of service was for three-years.

Sent to Tennessee the Regiment guarded rail lines from raiders.

The remaining men were mustered out on June 26, 1865, and discharged at St. Paul, Minnesota, on July 11, 1865.

Casualties
The 11th Minnesota Infantry suffered 3 enlisted men killed in action or who later died of their wounds, plus another 1 officer and 21 enlisted men who died of disease, for a total of 25
fatalities.

Colonels
Col. James B. Gilfillian - November 3, 1864, to June 26, 1865.

See also
List of Minnesota Civil War Units

Notes

References

External links
 The Civil War Archive
 Minnesota Historical Society page on Minnesota and the Civil War

Units and formations of the Union Army from Minnesota
1864 establishments in Minnesota
Military units and formations established in 1864
Military units and formations disestablished in 1865